Abiola Segun-Williams is a Nigerian actress, presenter, and scriptwriter popularly known for her role as Titi K in TV soap opera, Tinsel.

Early life 
She was born and raised in Lagos. Abiola finished her secondary education in 1983 and studied theatre Arts at the Obafemi Awolowo University, Ile Ife.

Career 
Abiola Segun-Williams became a professional actress in 1986. Her first acting role was a stage play titled Remilekun Jankarino by Ben Tomiloju in 1986. While in school, she started acting to earn a living. She featured in multiple stage plays, which showed in Lagos, Ibadan, Jos and Kaduna, and so on. She has gone on to feature in multiple productions such as In the cupboard by Desmond Elliot, I will take my chances produced by Emem Isong and Damages with Uche Jombo. She peresented a show called Adam and Eve for 5 years on NTA.

Filmography

TV Shows 

 Palava 
 Neighbour Neighbour

Films 

 Holding Hope
 Forgetting June
Finding Mercy
 Baby Shower
 The Patient
 The Paternity
 Diary of A Crazy Nigerian Woman

Personal life 
Abiola Segun-Williams is married with two children. She suffers from scleroderma.

See also
 List of Nigerian actors

References 

Year of birth missing (living people)
Living people
Nigerian television actresses
Actresses from Lagos
Obafemi Awolowo University alumni
Nigerian film actresses
Nigerian screenwriters
Nigerian television presenters
Nigerian television personalities